Francis Peter Leipzig (June 29, 1895—January 17, 1981) was an American prelate of the Roman Catholic Church. He served as Bishop of Baker from 1950 to 1971.

Biography
Francis Leipzig was born in Chilton, Wisconsin, the fourth child of Francis and Mary (née Cordy) Leipzig. He enrolled at St. Francis Seminary in Milwaukee, but later moved with his family to Portland, Oregon. He attended Mount Angel Seminary and then studied theology at St. Patrick's Seminary in Menlo Park, California. He was ordained to the priesthood by Archbishop Alexander Christie on April 17, 1920. He served as a curate at St. James Church in McMinnville and afterwards at  Good Shepherd Church in Sheridan. He was transferred to the Cathedral of Portland in 1921. He was pastor of St. Mary Church in Corvallis for seven years before being transferred to St. Mary Church in Eugene.

On July 18, 1950, Leipzig was appointed the third Bishop of Baker City by Pope Pius XII (see changed to Baker in 1952). He received his episcopal consecration on the following September 12 from Archbishop Edward Daniel Howard, with Archbishop Edwin Vincent O'Hara and Bishop Edward Joseph Kelly serving as co-consecrators. Between 1962 and 1965, he attended all four sessions of the Second Vatican Council. During his 21-year-long tenure, he built over 95 churches, hospitals, schools, and convents. After reaching the mandatory retirement age of 75, he resigned as bishop on April 26, 1971. Leipzig later died at age 85.

References

1895 births
1981 deaths
People from Chilton, Wisconsin
Roman Catholic Archdiocese of Portland in Oregon
20th-century Roman Catholic bishops in the United States
Participants in the Second Vatican Council
Roman Catholic bishops of Baker
St. Francis Seminary (Wisconsin) alumni
Saint Patrick's Seminary and University alumni
Mount Angel Seminary
Catholics from Wisconsin